Revd. Thomas Christy ARCO (7 October 1905 – 1976) was an organist and Priest in the Church of England based in England.

Life

He was born in 1905 in South Shields, the son of Thomas Christy and Mary. He was educated at King's College, Durham from 1926 to 1929.

He was an organist for several years before ordination. He studied for the priesthood at Queen's College, Edgbaston, from 1946 to 1947. He was made deacon in 1947 and priest in 1948.

Appointments

Assistant Organist of Newcastle Cathedral 1928–1933
Organist of Hexham Abbey 1933–1945
Curate at St Paul's Church, Whitley Bay 1947–1951
Rector of Alyth and Meigle 1951–1953
Vicar of St. Paul's Church, Alnwick 1953–1959
Rector of Creiff 1960–1963
Rector of Newton-in-the-Isle, Cambridgshire 1963–unknown

Compositions

His compositions include compositions for choir and organ.

References

1905 births
1976 deaths
English organists
British male organists
20th-century classical musicians
20th-century English composers
20th-century organists
20th-century British male musicians